Lamina-associated polypeptide 2 (LAP2), isoforms beta/gamma is a protein that in humans is encoded by the TMPO gene. LAP2 is an inner nuclear membrane (INM) protein.

Thymopoietin is a protein involved in the induction of CD90 in the thymus.  The thymopoetin (TMPO) gene encodes three alternatively spliced mRNAs encoding proteins of 75 kDa (alpha), 51 kDa (beta) and 39 kDa (gamma) which are ubiquitously expressed in all cells. The human TMPO gene maps to chromosome band 12q22 and consists of eight exons. TMPO alpha is present diffusely expressed with the cell nucleus while TMPO beta and gamma are localized to the nuclear membrane. TMPO beta is a human homolog of the murine protein LAP2. LAP2 plays a role in the regulation of nuclear architecture by binding lamin B1 and chromosomes. This interaction is regulated by phosphorylation during mitosis. Given the nuclear localization of the three TMPO isoforms, it is unlikely that these proteins play any role in CD90 induction.

Interactions 

Thymopoietin has been shown to interact with Barrier to autointegration factor 1, AKAP8L, LMNB1 and LMNA.

References

Further reading

External links 
 

Proteins